General Díaz Football Club is a Paraguayan football club from Luque that currently plays in the División Intermedia. Founded in 1917, it plays at the Estadio General Adrián Jara in Luque.

The club's name came from José Eduvigis Díaz, a Paraguayan general.

History 
The club was founded on September 22, 1917.

In 2004, the club finished as runner-up of the Tercera División, but only one club was available for promotion at that time. In 2006, they were runner-up again, but this time they were able to be promoted to the Segunda Division (Intermedia). In 2012, they were the champions of the Division Intermedia, and were promoted to the Primera Division for the first time in the club's history.

In 2013, the club qualified for its first ever continental tournament, the Copa Sudamericana, through their placement in the aggregate table (Apertura & Clausura combined). They did this in their first season in the top tier, being one of the only two Paraguayan clubs to achieve this along with Deportivo Capiatá. In the 2014 Copa Sudamericana, they played C.D. Cobresal of Chile first, and won 4-3 on aggregate (2-1, 2-2). Then they played Colombian powerhouse Atlético Nacional, where they produced a massive upset by winning the first leg at the Estadio Atanasio Girardot in Medellín 2-0, but lost the second leg in Luque 1-3. Although the aggregate score was 3-3, Atletico Nacional advanced because of the away goals rule.

In 2017, the club finished sixth in the aggregate league table, meaning it qualified for the 2018 Copa Sudamericana, their second time participating in the competition. They began their campaign by playing against Ecuadorian powerhouse Barcelona S.C., beating them 2-1 on aggregate. Then they faced Colombian side Millonarios F.C., where they drew the first leg 1-1 at Estadio Defensores del Chaco in Asunción. They played there because their regular stadium was too small for continental competition games. General Díaz lost the second leg 4-0 at Estadio El Campín in Bogotá, and were knocked out of the tournament with an aggregate score of 1-5.

Stadium 

General Diaz plays its home games at Estadio General Adrían Jara, which has a capacity of 4,000 and was built in 1974. The stadium is currently undergoing a renovation and expansion since January 2019. The stadium's capacity will be expanded from 4000 to 7000, and will have a new press box and new changing rooms.

Honours
División Intermedia: (1)
2012
División Intermedia: (0)
Runner-up: 2007
Paraguayan Tercera División: (0)
Runner-up: 2004, 2006
Regional League Titles: (3) (Liga Luqueña de Fútbol)
1966, 1967, 1968

Current squad

Notable players
To appear in this section a player must have either:
 Played at least 125 games for the club.
 Set a club record or won an individual award while at the club.
 Been part of a national team at any time.
 Played in the first division of any other football association (outside of Paraguay).
 Played in a continental and/or intercontinental competition.

2000's
 Javier Cohene (2005)
2010's
  César Caicedo (2014)

References

External links
Official Website
General Díaz at Albigol

General Díaz Football Club at Tigo Sports Paraguay
General Díaz at BeSoccer

General Diaz (Luque)
General Diaz (Luque)
1917 establishments in Paraguay